GMC may refer to:

Government

India
 Gandhinagar Municipal Corporation, in Gujarat
 Gobichettipalayam Municipal Corporation, in Tamil Nadu
 Guntur Municipal Corporation, in Andhra Pradesh
 Guwahati Municipal Corporation, in Assam
 Gwalior Municipal Corporation, in Madhya Pradesh

United Kingdom
 General Medical Council
 Greater Manchester Council, a former local authority
 NHS Genomic Medicine Centres

Schools

India
 Gandhi Medical College, in Hyderabad
 Gandhi Medical College, Bhopal
 Goa Medical College
 Government Medical College (disambiguation)
 Grant Medical College, in Mumbai
 Guntur Medical College

Other places
 Gomal Medical College, of Khyber Medical University in Dera Ismail Khan, Pakistan
 Gujranwala Medical College, Pakistan
 Greenwich Maritime Centre of the University of Greenwich, United Kingdom
 Georgia Military College,  in Milledgeville, Georgia, United States
 Green Mountain College, in Poultney, Vermont, United States

Science and technology 
 Geiger–Müller counter
 Genetically modified crops
 Ganglion mother cell
 Generalized Method of Cells
 Giant molecular cloud
 Global motion compensation
 Gun Motor Carriage, a collective term for American World War II tank destroyers
Gold Master Candidate, a candidate for a final version of software ready for release to manufacturing.

Companies
 GMC (automobile), including a list of GMC vehicles
 General Motors company
 General Motors Canada, the Canadian subsidiary of General Motors
 GMC TV, now Up TV, an American television network
 A bicycle manufactured by Kent International

Other uses
 GMC Athletic Stadium, Bambolim, Goa, India
 G. M. C. Balayogi (1951–2002), Indian lawyer and politician
 Gambia Moral Congress, a political party
 Germanic languages
 Global Management Challenge, a competition for university students
 Global Methodist Church
 Global Movement for Children
 Gray Matters Capital, an American impact investing foundation
 Great Midwest Conference, a former NCAA athletic conference
 Greater Manchester Challenge, a yacht
 Green Mountain Club, an American hiking organization
 Gwinnett Medical Center, in Georgia, United States
 Guangmingcheng railway station, China Railway pinyin code GMC
 A variant of the Martin MB-1 bomber

See also